Job Ross House at 817 Exchange Street is a historic house in Astoria in the U.S. state of Oregon. The house was built by Job Ross about 1860. The one-and-half story home was also known as Klamath House and is not listed on the National Register of Historic Places. The address of the house was 361 Astor using the street names in force until the late 1890s. Then it became 361 Exchange, until the change in numbering in the 1955, when it assumed its current number. Job Ross lived in the house until his death on April 11, 1895, and his son George W. Ross lived there in 1896.

The Loyal Order of Moose acquired the building in 1925 for use as a lodge, and dedicated it for this purpose on July 1 of that year. The Moose Order moved to a new lodge in 1948. It was used as a Mormon meetinghouse from 1950 to 1966.

References

19th-century Latter Day Saint church buildings
Houses in Astoria, Oregon
Former churches in Oregon
Former Latter Day Saint religious buildings and structures
Churches completed in 1860
1860 establishments in Oregon
Moose International